is a railway station on the Sōya Main Line in the city of Wakkanai, Hokkaido, operated by Hokkaido Railway Company (JR Hokkaido). It is the northern terminus of the Sōya Main Line, and is also the northernmost railway station in Japan.

Lines
The station is numbered "W80".

Layout
Wakkanai Station has a 1 single side platform. The station building was renewed in 2011.

Platforms

Limited express services
Wakkanai is served by the following limited express services in addition to all-stations "Local" services.
 Sōya (Sapporo – Wakkanai)
 Sarobetsu (Asahikawa – Wakkanai)

Adjacent stations

History
The station opened on 26 December 1926, initially named . It was renamed Wakkanai on 1 February 1939 at the same time as the original Wakkanai Station was renamed Minami-Wakkanai Station.

With the privatization of Japanese National Railways (JNR) on 1 April 1987, the station came under the control of JR Hokkaido.

Surrounding area
Port of Wakkanai
It takes about 7 minutes from here to Port of Wakkanai on foot.
It takes about 3 minutes from here to Port of Wakkanai by bus at 700 yen(adult) or 350 yen(children).

See also
 List of railway stations in Japan

References

External links

Railway stations in Hokkaido Prefecture
Railway stations in Japan opened in 1928